Jon Cutler may refer to:

 Jon Cutler (wrestler)
 Jon Cutler (musician)

See also
 John Cutler (disambiguation)